The 1891 Missouri Tigers football team was an American football team that represented the University of Missouri as an independent during the 1891 college football season. In the school's second year of intercollegiate football, the team was led by head coach Hal Reid and compiled a 3–1 record.

Schedule

References

Missouri
Missouri Tigers football seasons
Missouri Tigers football